Musannaf Ibn Abi Shaybah is one of the well-known compilations of Hadith (narrations) of Mohammad, his predecessors and companions. These prophetic traditions, or hadith, were collected by Muslim scholar Ibn Abi Shaybah (159H-235H).

Description 
It is one of the largest compilations of Hadiths, including more than thirty seven thousand (37,000) Hadiths. The goal of these authors was to collect whatever they found, not to extract the best, nor to refine them, nor to make them more accessible for use. One of the goals Ibn Abi Shaybah had was to refute the jurist, Abu Hanifa with a whole chapter in his compilation attacking his views.  

Shaybah narrated reports from predecessors about each subject area, including the controversial topics of discussions between Muslims, like the Battle of Siffin, the Battle of the Camel, the Battle of Nahrawan and the death of the 3rd Caliph, Uthman. It includes Ahaadeeth classified as saheeh (sound), marfoo‘ (attributed to Muhammad), mawqoof (attributed to the Companions), and  munqaṭiʻ (with discontinuity in chain of transmission).

Multiple manuscripts have been preserved (some printed more recently in Delhi and volumes of much more earlier manuscripts also exist) and some may differ.

See also
 List of Sunni books
 Kutub al-Sittah
 Sahih Muslim
 Jami al-Tirmidhi
 Sunan Abu Dawood
 Either: Sunan ibn Majah, Muwatta Malik

References 

Sunni literature
Sunni hadith collections